The Polish Academy Award for Best Documentary has been awarded annually since 2013 by the Polish Film Academy. It is given to director of the picture.

Winners and nominees

References

External links 
 Polish Film Awards; Official website (Polish)

Documentary film awards
Polish film awards
Awards established in 2013